Maurice Williams may refer to:
Mo Williams (Maurice Williams, born 1982), basketball player
Maurice Williams (offensive tackle) (born 1979), American football player
Maurice Williams (politician) (1926–2004), member of the Western Australian Legislative Assembly from the 1960s
Maurice Williams (rugby league) (born 1942), rugby league footballer of the 1960s
Maurice Williams (wide receiver) (born 1987), American football player
Maurice Williams, reporter for WHUR-FM who was killed in the 1977 Hanafi Muslim Siege
Maurice Williams (born 1938), lead singer with Maurice Williams and the Zodiacs

See also
Morris Williams (1809–1874), Welsh clergyman and writer
Morris Williams (politician) (1924–1995), Australian politician
Morris Meredith Williams (1881–1973), British painter and illustrator